The 2020 Grambling State Tigers football team represented Grambling State University in the 2020–21 NCAA Division I FCS football season. The Tigers were led by seventh-year head coach Broderick Fobbs and played their home games at Eddie Robinson Stadium in Grambling, Louisiana as members of the West Division of the Southwestern Athletic Conference (SWAC).

On July 20, 2020, the Southwestern Athletic Conference announced that it would not play fall sports due to the COVID-19 pandemic, which includes the football program. The conference is formalizing plans to conduct a competitive schedule for football during the 2021 spring semester.

Previous season

The Tigers finished the 2019 season 6–5, 4–3 in SWAC play to finish tied for second place in the West Division.

Preseason

Recruiting class
Reference:

|}

Preseason polls
The SWAC will release their polls in July 2020.

Preseason all–SWAC teams

Offense

Defense

Schedule
The 2020 schedule consists of 3 home, 5 away, and 2 neutral site games in the regular season. The Tigers will travel to SWAC foes Alcorn State, Texas Southern, and Alabama A&M. The Tigers will play host to SWAC foes Mississippi Valley State, Alabama State, and Arkansas–Pine Bluff. The Tigers will play two neutral site conference games—the State Fair Classic against Prairie View A&M at the Cotton Bowl in Dallas, TX and the Bayou Classic against Southern at the Mercedes-Benz Superdome in New Orleans, LA.

Due to the SWAC's postponement of the 2020 football season to spring 2021, games against South Alabama, South Carolina State and UTSA were canceled. The SWAC released updated spring schedules on August 17.

Game summaries

Jackson State

vs. Prairie View A&M

Arkansas–Pine Bluff

vs. Southern

References

Grambling State
Grambling State Tigers football seasons
College football winless seasons
Grambling State Tigers football